The 2015 Men's FIBA COCABA Championship was the regional basketball championship of FIBA Americas for the Central American and Caribbean subzone. The top 3 national teams qualified to 2016 Centrobasket. The tournament was held in the city of San José, Costa Rica, from 16 to 20 September 2015.

Participating teams 
 
 
 
 
  (withdrew)
 
 
 

Costa Rica qualified as host.

Preliminary round 
The draw for the 2015 FIBA COCABA Championship was held on August 4, 2015. Eight teams were drawn into two pools with 4 teams in each.

Group A

Group B

Knockout round

5th−7th places semifinal

Semifinals

5th place match

Third place match

Final

Final ranking

FIBA COCABA Championship
2015–16 in North American basketball
2015 in Costa Rican sport
2015 in Central American sport
International basketball competitions hosted by Costa Rica
Sport in San José, Costa Rica